Fleksy is a third-party, proprietary virtual keyboard app for Android and iOS devices. It attempts to improve traditional typing speed and accuracy through enhanced auto-correction and gesture controls. Fleksy uses error-correcting algorithms that analyze the region where the user touches the keyboard and feeds this through a language model, which calculates and identifies the intended word. Swiping gestures are used to control common functions, such as space, delete, and word correction.

Fleksy has introduced Fleksyapps, which are mini-programs and Fleksynext, its Smart Assistant that utilizes artificial intelligence capable of understanding intent, sentiment and context while typing.

History

Fleksy was developed by Fleksy Inc., a company founded in 2011. It was originally developed for the blind and visually impaired to enable typing through muscle memory.

In July 2012, Fleksy became commercially available on the iPhone as a download from Apple's iOS App Store. On June 15, 2016, the company moved on to Pinterest.

In July 2017, Thingthing Ltd., a competing keyboard company, acquired Fleksy and resumed its development. In 2018, the Fleksy keyboard was acquired by Thingthing Ltd., and given an upgrade. 

In summer of 2018, Fleksy opened a seed crowdfunding campaign on Crowdcube. In October 2018, Fleksy partnered with Palm and was preinstalled as the default keyboard on all Palm devices.

In 2019, Fleksy introduced Fleksyapps "mini app programs." Afterwards, Fleksy releases its smart assistant, Fleksynext. In October, Fleksy was forced to raise the rating of its keyboard app to PEGI 12 rating on Google Play compared to PEGI 3 carried by Gboard, Google's own app. This rating was restored after the company contacted the International Age Rating Coalition.

In 2019, Fleksy became the first keyboard used for Active Digital Phenotyping in the Healthcare space.

In May 2020, Fleksy pivots towards became a B2B technology provider, launching its Software Development Kit (SDK) called "Fleksy for Business" and taking on clients in Healthcare, CyberSafety, Advertising, and Banking Payments.

In February 2021, Fleksy expanded it's SDK clientele to the Gaming industry. In October 2021, Fleksy announced it has raised a Series A from Inveready to support the growth of the Fleksy keyboard SDK, helping clients in various industries leverage its input method technologies.

Software

Fleksy’s auto-correct algorithm functions by combining analysis of user typing patterns and linguistic context. Analysis of tap locations (rather than letters selected) affords it the ability to remain tolerant of drifting errors and allows the user to type on an invisible keyboard or even off the keyboard in some instances. As a result, Fleksy has been embraced by the visually-impaired community. The software has been considered for the "Story of the Year" of the Technology Year in Review for 2012 by the American Foundation for the Blind.

Fleksy allows sighted people to blind-type on a touchscreen. Quentin Stafford-Fraser said on his website: "I found I could type whole sentences immediately, without looking at the keyboard".

Availability
Fleksy is available in 65 languages and QWERTY, AZERTY, QWERTZ, Dvorak, and Colemak layouts on Android and iOS.

Awards
Fleksy has received a number of awards since its release in July 2012:
Officially broke Guinness World Record for fastest touch-screen text message in May 2014
South by Southwest Interactive Accelerator 2013 Winner
Apple's Best of App Store 2012
CES 2013 Innovation honoree
Qualcomm QPrize finalist
Royal National Institute of Blind People, app of the month for August 2012
Golden Apple Award

References

External links
 Fleksy home page

IOS software
Android virtual keyboards
Input methods for handheld devices
Pointing-device text input
User interface techniques